Cumberland is a census-designated place (CDP) in and the county seat of Cumberland County, Virginia, United States. Cumberland lies along U.S. Route 60 and State Route 45. The population as of the 2010 Census was 393.

References

Census-designated places in Cumberland County, Virginia
County seats in Virginia
Census-designated places in Virginia